Gabriel Serbian (May 1, 1977 – April 30, 2022) was an American drummer, guitarist and vocalist, most famous for his work in The Locust, Cattle Decapitation, Holy Molar and Zu. He was also a member of Head Wound City, a hardcore/punk rock supergroup.

He performed with Alec Empire, Nic Endo, Charlie Clouser, and Merzbow, and drummed for Otto von Schirach on a European tour and also when von Schirach played/toured with The Locust.

Serbian was praised by Dave Lombardo of Slayer, who said that "There's a band called The Locust. Their drummer is named Gabe Serbian, and their music hits me now like D.R.I. hit me in the early '80s".

Serbian died on April 30, 2022, at the age of 44.

References

External links
 
 

1977 births
2022 deaths
American drummers
Death metal musicians
Place of death missing
Place of birth missing
Head Wound City members
The Locust members
Dead Cross members
Le Butcherettes members